Nowosiedlice  is a village in the administrative district of Gmina Dobroszyce, within Oleśnica County, Lower Silesian Voivodeship, in south-western Poland.

The village has a population of 142.

References

Nowosiedlice